The following is a comprehensive discography of Andrew W.K., an American rock musician.

Albums

Studio albums

Compilation albums
The Very Best So Far (2008, Universal Music Japan)
Premium Collection (2008, Universal Music Japan)
Mother of Mankind "Rare & Unreleased 1999-2010" (2010, Steev Mike)

Unreleased albums
Necronomicon (Unreleased LP under full name Andrew Wilkes-Krier, originally intended to be released in 1998)
We Want Fun (Unreleased LP originally intended as a debut album in 2001)
The Carrier (Unreleased Rock 'n' Roll LP dating back to 2005) 
Young Lord (Unreleased experimental LP dating back to 2005) 
Unnamed instrumental (Unreleased piano-solo LP dating back to 2005)
Eberwhite (Unreleased LP dating back to 2005)

EPs
Girls Own Juice (AWKGOJ) (EP) (1999, Bulb Records)
Party Til You Puke (EP) (2000, Bulb Records)
The "Party All Goddamn Night" EP (EP) (2011 Japan only EP) Universal Music Group

Split releases
A Wild Pear (Split 7" with The Evaporators) (2009, Mint Records, Nardwuar Records)
We Got a Groove (Split 7" with Riverboat Gamblers) (2009, Volcom Entertainment)

Singles
 "Room to Breathe" (sic) (under his full name, Andrew Wilkes-Krier) (1998, Hanson Records)
 "You Are What You Eat", (under his full name, Andrew Wilkes-Krier) (was to be 1998, went unreleased, Hanson Records)
 "Party Hard" (October, 2001) - UK #19
 "She Is Beautiful" (February, 2002) - UK #55
 "We Want Fun" (December 2002)
 "Fun Night" (2002)
 "Tear It Up" (July 2003)
 "Never Let Down" (September 2003)
 "Long Live the Party" (2003, Japan only)
 "Son Nano Kankei Neh Rock" (2008, Japan only mobile ringtone)
 "Kiseki" (2008, Japan only) (Greeeen cover)
 "Kiba" (2010, Japan only, featured vocalist with Marty Friedman)
 "I'm a Vagabond" (7" vinyl single) (February 2010, Big Scary Monsters)
 "I Was Born to Love You" (2011, Japan only)
 "Go Go Go Go" (November 1, 2011) [The W.S.C.]
 "Music Is Worth Living For" (January 12, 2018) 
 "Ever Again" (January 29, 2018)
 "My Tower" (January 15, 2021) (cancelled)
"Babalon" (February 17, 2021, Napalm Records)
"I'm in Heaven" (May 6, 2021, Napalm Records)

Music videos
 Party Hard (2001)
 She Is Beautiful (2002)
 We Want Fun (2002)
 Never Let Down (2003)
 Your Rules (2003)
 Totally Stupid (2003)
 Long Live the Party (2003)
 Not Going to Bed (2007)
 Hearing What I Said (2009)
 I'm a Vagabond (2010)
 I Want to See You Go Wild (2010)
 GO GO GO GO (2011)
 It's Time to Party (2012)
 Ever Again (2018)
 Music Is Worth Living For (2018)
 You're Not Alone (2018)
 Babalon (2021)
I'm In Heaven (2021)
 Everybody Sins (2021)

DVDs
 Tear It Up DVD (2003) - Includes A.W.K. music videos and concert footage
 The Wolf Bonus DVD (2003) - Japanese import version, includes exclusive behind-the-scenes footage
 Who Knows? (2006) - Feature length live concert movie
 Close Calls With Brick Walls Bonus DVD (2006) - Japanese import version, includes exclusive A.W.K. footage

Film and television soundtracks
 Out Cold feat. "She Is Beautiful"
 Jackass: The Movie feat. "We Want Fun"
 Stealing Harvard feat. "Party Hard"
 Old School feat. "Fun Night"
 Freaky Friday feat. "She Is Beautiful"
 Dance of the Dead feat. "You Will Remember Tonight"
 Masters of Horror Soundtrack feat. "You Will Remember Tonight"
 American Pie Presents: Band Camp feat. "She Is Beautiful"
 Aqua Teen Hunger Force Colon Movie Film for Theaters Colon the Soundtrack feat. "Party Party Party"

Compilation appearances
 Labyrinths & Jokes (Hanson Records Release HN050) Song: Andrew Wilkes-Krier (Andrew also appeared on the Isis and Werewolves track and The Beast People track).
 "Dude, That's My Skull" feat. "We Want Fun" (2001, Island Records) 
 Ozzfest 2002 Live Album feat. "She Is Beautiful" (Live with Kelly Osbourne)
 Take Action! Vol 4 feat. Spoken PSA Intro
 Mosh Pit On Disney feat. "Mickey Mouse Club March"
 Maxim Rocks! Magazine Compilation feat. "She Is Beautiful"
 Girls Gone Wild Music, Vol. 1 feat. "Party Hard"
 Hard to Get V1 Island Rarities feat. "We Want Fun" (AWKGOJ version)
 Warped Tour 2003 Tour Compilation feat. "Ready to Die"
 Serve 2: The Hard Rock Benefit Album feat. "This Is My World"
2776 feat. "Party on Your Grave"

Production credits
 Fortune Dove EP - by Wolf Eyes (2000) Producer/Mixer
 Noon & Eternity - by To Live And Shave In L.A. (2006) Album Co-Producer/Mixer
 Repentance - by Lee "Scratch" Perry (2008) Album Co-Producer/Mixer
 Through the Panama - by Sightings (2007) Album Producer/Mixer
 DAMN! The Mixtape Vol. 1 - by Various artists (2009) Executive Producer/Producer
 Bangers & Beans EP - Aleister X (2009) Producer/Mixer
 The Git EP - Aleister X (2010) Producer/Mixer
 WERK The Remix EP - Cherie Lily (2010) Mixer/Remixer
 Regifted Light - Baby Dee (2011) Producer/Mixer

Mixing credits
 Bastard EP - by Hifiklub (2009) Mixer
 How to Make Friends - by Hifiklub (2009) Mixer on tracks 1-4
 WERK The Remixes - by Cherie Lily (2010) Mixer on select tracks

Performances
 "électricité" - by Mike Pachelli - featuring Andrew W.K. on piano (2007)
 Safe Inside the Day - by Baby Dee - featuring Andrew W.K. on bass guitar and drums (2008)
 "mc chris is dead" - by mc chris - featuring Andrew W.K.'s backing vocals on the song, "Never Give Up" (2008)
 "Birth Canal Blues STUDIO/LIVE" - by Current 93 - featuring Andrew W.K. on bass guitar (2008)
 "Anok Pe: Aleph at Hallucinatory Mountain" - by Current 93 - featuring Andrew W.K. on bass guitar, piano, and vocals (2009)
 "Sparks" - by Sahara Hotnights - featuring Andrew W.K.'s vocal duet on the song, "Mess Around" (2009)
 "Do They Know It's Christmas?" - by Fucked Up - featuring Andrew W.K.'s vocals along with other various artists. This is also a single.
 "Kiba" - by Marty Friedman - featuring Andrew W.K.'s vocals on both Japanese and English versions (2010)
 "I'm A Gonner" - by Matt & Kim and Soulja Boy - featuring Andrew W.K.'s vocals (2011)
 "I Hate Being Late When I'm Early" - by The Evaporators - Organ & Vocals, Written by Andrew W.K. (2012)
 "Bring It On Home" - by The Evaporators - Featuring Andrew W.K. on piano (2012)

Remixes
 "We Sing of Only Blood or Love" - by Dax Riggs - featuring Andrew W.K. remixed song, "Dethbryte" (2007)
 "At Dawn (Vogel)" - by Pantaleimon - Remixed by Andrew W.K. (2008)
 "How We Roll" from "Dancing in a Minefield EP" - by Plushgun - Remixed by Andrew W.K. (2008)
 "Say Goodbye" - by Samuel - Remixed by Andrew W.K. (2009)
 "The Afterlife" - by YACHT (Jona Bechtolt) - Remixed by Andrew W.K. (2009)
 "Even Think" - by Drink Up Butter Cup - Remixed by Andrew W.K. (2009)
 "Devil Knows" - by Hifiklub - Remixed by Andrew W.K. (2009)
 "House Party" - by 3OH!3 - Remixed by Andrew W.K. (2010)
 "Felicia" - by The Constellations - Remixed by Andrew W.K. (2010)
 "Werk" - by Cherie Lily - Remixed by Princess Superstar and Andrew W.K. (2010)
 "Like It's Her Birthday" - by Good Charlotte - Remixed by Andrew W.K. (2010)
 "My Town" - by Hollywood Undead - Remixed by Andrew W.K. (2011)
 "Earthquakey People" - by Steve Aoki ft. Rivers Cuomo - Remixed by Andrew W.K. (2011)

Video game appearances
Andrew W.K. lent his voice to ESPN NFL 2K5; he is also unlockable as a free agent quarterback in the game.
Andrew W.K. appears in Backyard Wrestling 2: There Goes The Neighborhood as a playable character, he also provides "Party Hard" and "Your Rules" to the soundtrack.
Andrew W.K. provides "Party Hard" to the Pro Evolution Soccer 2010 OST.
A cover of "Party Hard" by Brad Holmes appears on Guitar Freaks 9th Mix / drummania 8th Mix.
"Party Hard" is available as a DLC track for the Rock Band games.
"Tear It Up" is featured in NASCAR Thunder 2004.
Andrew W.K Voices a Radio Host named "Red Eye" in Bethesda Game Studios Game Fallout 4 (2016) DLC Nuka World.

External links
The Official Andrew W.K. website
AndrewWKMusic.net/discography - a fan-site containing an even more detailed discography

References

Discographies of American artists